Katie Crowley (born 12 September 1982) is a female basketball player who plays for England women's national basketball team.

References

1982 births
Living people
Place of birth missing (living people)
English women's basketball players
Commonwealth Games medallists in basketball
Commonwealth Games bronze medallists for England
Basketball players at the 2006 Commonwealth Games
Medallists at the 2006 Commonwealth Games